John Frederick Lundbom (March 10, 1877 – October 31, 1949) was a Major League Baseball pitcher who played for one season. He pitched in eight games for the Cleveland Bronchos during the 1902 Cleveland Bronchos season.

External links

1877 births
1949 deaths
Major League Baseball pitchers
Cleveland Bronchos players
Grand Rapids Furniture Makers players
Toledo Mud Hens players
Butte Miners players
Portland Green Gages players
Salt Lake City Elders players
Evansville River Rats players
Baseball players from Michigan
People from Manistee, Michigan